Sorozhino is a rural locality (a village) and the administrative center of Kubenskoye Rural Settlement, Kharovsky District, Vologda Oblast, Russia. The population was 221 as of 2010.

Geography 
Sorozhino is located 16 km northwest of Kharovsk (the district's administrative centre) by road. Konevo is the nearest rural locality.

References 

Rural localities in Kharovsky District